The moths of Ethiopia represent about 700 known moth species. The moths (mostly nocturnal) and butterflies (mostly diurnal) together make up the taxonomic order Lepidoptera.

This is a list of moth species which have been recorded in Ethiopia.

Arctiidae
Acantharctia nigrivena Rothschild, 1935
Afrasura indecisa (Walker, 1869)
Afrasura rivulosa (Walker, 1854)
Afrasura terlinea Durante, 2009
Alpenus diversata (Hampson, 1916)
Alpenus geminipuncta (Hampson, 1916)
Alpenus investigatorum (Karsch, 1898)
Alpenus nigropunctata (Bethune-Baker, 1908)
Alpenus schraderi (Rothschild, 1910)
Amata alicia (Butler, 1876)
Amata rufina (Oberthür, 1878)
Amata shoa (Hampson, 1898)
Amata velatipennis (Walker, 1864)
Amerila affinis (Rothschild, 1910)
Amerila bubo (Walker, 1855)
Amerila niveivitrea (Bartel, 1903)
Amerila puella (Fabricius, 1793)
Amerila vidua (Cramer, 1780)
Amphicallia kostlani Strand, 1911
Amphicallia solai (Druce, 1907)
Amsacta melanogastra (Holland, 1897)
Amsacta nigrisignata Gaede, 1923
Amsactarctia radiosa (Pagenstecher, 1903)
Amsactarctia venusta (Toulgoët, 1980)
Automolis crassa (Felder, 1874)
Automolis pallida (Hampson, 1901)
Carcinarctia rougeoti Toulgoët, 1977
Creatonotos leucanioides Holland, 1893
Cyana ugandana (Strand, 1912)
Diota rostrata (Wallengren, 1860)
Eilema elegans (Butler, 1877)
Estigmene multivittata Rothschild, 1910
Euchromia folletii (Guérin-Méneville, 1832)
Eyralpenus scioana (Oberthür, 1880)
Galtara doriae (Oberthür, 1880)
Galtara elongata (Swinhoe, 1907)
Ischnarctia cinerea (Pagenstecher, 1903)
Metarctia carmel Kiriakoff, 1957
Metarctia flavivena Hampson, 1901
Metarctia fulvia Hampson, 1901
Metarctia galla Rougeot, 1977
Metarctia haematricha Hampson, 1905
Metarctia lateritia Herrich-Schäffer, 1855
Metarctia negusi Kiriakoff, 1957
Metarctia noctis Druce, 1910
Metarctia tenebrosa (Le Cerf, 1922)
Metarctia unicolor (Oberthür, 1880)
Micralarctia punctulatum (Wallengren, 1860)
Nyctemera apicalis (Walker, 1854)
Nyctemera restrictum (Butler, 1894)
Ovenna hailesellassiei Birket-Smith, 1965
Paralacydes minorata (Berio, 1935)
Paraonagylla zavattarii Berio, 1939
Radiarctia jacksoni (Rothschild, 1910)
Secusio strigata Walker, 1854
Seydelia geometrica (Oberthür, 1883)
Spilosoma lineata Walker, 1855
Spilosoma mediopunctata (Pagenstecher, 1903)
Spilosoma quadrimacula Toulgoët, 1977
Stenilema aurantiaca Hampson, 1909
Teracotona abyssinica (Rothschild, 1933)
Teracotona clara Holland, 1892
Teracotona jacksoni (Rothschild, 1910)
Teracotona neumanni Rothschild, 1933
Teracotona postalbida (Gaede, 1926)
Teracotona proditrix (Berio, 1939)
Teracotona pruinosa de Joannis, 1912
Teracotona seminigra (Hampson, 1905)
Teracotona subterminata Hampson, 1901
Thyretes negus Oberthür, 1878
Utetheisa amhara Jordan, 1939

Carposinidae
Carposina candace Meyrick, 1932

Choreutidae
Brenthia leucatoma Meyrick, 1918
Choreutis argyrastra Meyrick, 1932
Telosphrantis aethiopica Meyrick, 1932

Coleophoridae
Blastobasis eridryas Meyrick, 1932
Blastobasis industria Meyrick, 1913

Cosmopterigidae
Ascalenia secretifera Meyrick, 1932
Cosmopterix epismaragda Meyrick, 1932

Cossidae
Cossus abyssinica Hampson, 1910
Oreocossus ungemachi Rougeot, 1977

Crambidae
Ancylolomia perfasciata Hampson, 1919
Crambus arnaudiae Rougeot, 1977
Crambus bachi Bassi, 2012
Crambus boislamberti Rougeot, 1977
Crambus caligula Błeszyński, 1961
Crambus dedalus Bassi, 2000
Crambus descarpentriesi (Rougeot, 1977)
Crambus diarhabdellus Hampson, 1919
Crambus jupiter Błeszyński, 1963
Crambus mesombrellus Hampson, 1919
Crambus netuncus Bassi, 2012
Crambus richteri Błeszyński, 1963
Culladia achroellum (Mabille, 1900)
Euctenospila castalis Warren, 1892
Ghesquierellana hirtusalis (Walker, 1859)
Nomophila noctuella ([Denis & Schiffermüller], 1775)
Prionapteryx selenalis (Hampson, 1919)
Pyrausta centralis Maes, 2009
Syllepte ovialis (Walker, 1859)
Tegostoma richteri Amsel, 1963
Tegostoma subterminalis Hampson, 1918
Udea ferrugalis (Hübner, 1796)

Elachistidae
Elachista delocharis Meyrick, 1932

Eupterotidae
Hoplojana abyssinica Rothschild, 1917

Gelechiidae
Ochrodia subdiminutella (Stainton, 1867)
Stomopteryx ochrosema Meyrick, 1932

Geometridae
Aphilopota calaria (Swinhoe, 1904)
Asthenotricha anisobapta Prout, 1932
Asthenotricha ansorgei Warren, 1899
Chiasmia butaria (Swinhoe, 1904)
Chiasmia dentilineata (Warren, 1899)
Chiasmia inconspicua (Warren, 1897)
Chiasmia maculosa (Warren, 1899)
Chiasmia obliquilineata (Warren, 1899)
Chiasmia observata (Walker, 1861)
Chiasmia procidata (Guenée, 1858)
Chiasmia sororcula (Warren, 1897)
Chiasmia streniata (Guenée, 1858)
Chiasmia subcurvaria (Mabille, 1897)
Chiasmia sufflata (Guenée, 1858)
Chiasmia umbratilis (Butler, 1875)
Chiasmia unifilata (Warren, 1899)
Cleora thyris D. S. Fletcher, 1967
Coenina aurivena Butler, 1898
Coenina dentataria Swinhoe, 1904
Disclisioprocta natalata (Walker, 1862)
Dithecodes ornithospila (Prout, 1911)
Drepanogynis nigerrima (Swinhoe, 1904)
Dysrhoe rhiogyra (Prout, 1932)
Ecpetala carnifasciata (Warren, 1899)
Epigynopteryx flavedinaria (Guenée, 1857)
Epigynopteryx scotti D. S. Fletcher, 1959
Erastria leucicolor (Butler, 1875)
Erastria marginata (Swinhoe, 1904)
Eupithecia angulata D. S. Fletcher, 1951
Eupithecia devestita (Warren, 1899)
Eupithecia dilucida (Warren, 1899)
Eupithecia dinshoensis Herbulot, 1983
Eupithecia incommoda Herbulot, 1983
Eupithecia isotenes Prout, 1932
Eupithecia ochralba Herbulot, 1983
Eupithecia pseudoabbreviata D. S. Fletcher, 1951
Eupithecia rigida Swinhoe, 1892
Eupithecia rougeoti Herbulot, 1983
Eupithecia rubristigma Prout, 1932
Eupithecia semipallida Janse, 1933
Eupithecia urbanata D. S. Fletcher, 1956
Geodena brunneomarginata Karisch, 2003
Hemidromodes unicolorata Hausmann, 1996
Hydrelia candace Prout, 1929
Hypochrosis chiarinii (Oberthür, 1883)
Isturgia catalaunaria (Guenée, 1858)
Isturgia deerraria (Walker, 1861)
Lhommeia biskraria (Oberthür, 1885)
Lomographa indularia (Guenée, 1858)
Mimoclystia deplanata (de Joannis, 1913)
Mimoclystia pudicata (Walker, 1862)
Nothofidonia xenoleuca Prout, 1928
Odontopera integraria Guenée, 1858
Odontopera protecta Herbulot, 1983
Omphacodes pulchrifimbria (Warren, 1902)
Oreometra ras Herbulot, 1983
Orthonama obstipata (Fabricius, 1794)
Pachypalpella subalbata (Warren, 1900)
Piercia zukwalensis Debauche, 1937
Prasinocyma albivenata Herbulot, 1983
Prasinocyma germinaria (Guenée, 1858)
Prasinocyma perpulverata Prout, 1916
Prasinocyma tranquilla Prout, 1917
Problepsis neumanni Prout, 1932
Protosteira spectabilis (Warren, 1899)
Pseudolarentia megalaria (Guenée, 1858)
Pseudolarentia monosticta (Butler, 1894)
Pseudosterrha rufistrigata (Hampson, 1896)
Rhodometra intervenata Warren, 1902
Rhodometra plectaria (Guenée, 1858)
Rougeotiella pseudonoctua Herbulot, 1983
Scopula erymna Prout, 1928
Scopula lactaria (Walker, 1861)
Scopula nemorivagata (Wallengren, 1863)
Scopula silonaria (Guenée, 1858)
Scopula simplificata Prout, 1928
Scotopteryx nictitaria (Herrich-Schäffer, 1855)
Sesquialtera lonchota Prout, 1931
Sesquialtera ridicula Prout, 1916
Somatina pythiaria (Guenée, 1858)
Tephronia aethiopica Herbulot, 1983
Traminda neptunaria (Guenée, 1858)
Trimetopia aetheraria Guenée, 1858
Xanthorhoe abyssinica Herbulot, 1983
Xanthorhoe alta Debauche, 1937
Xanthorhoe cadra (Debauche, 1937)
Xanthorhoe excelsissima Herbulot, 1977
Xanthorhoe exorista Prout, 1922
Xylopteryx raphaelaria (Oberthür, 1880)
Zamarada calypso Prout, 1926
Zamarada deceptrix Warren, 1914
Zamarada delta D. S. Fletcher, 1974
Zamarada erugata D. S. Fletcher, 1974
Zamarada excavata Bethune-Baker, 1913
Zamarada hyalinaria (Guenée, 1857)
Zamarada melasma D. S. Fletcher, 1974
Zamarada melpomene Oberthür, 1912
Zamarada phaeozona Hampson, 1909
Zamarada secutaria (Guenée, 1858)
Zamarada torrida D. S. Fletcher, 1974

Glyphipterigidae
Ussara semicoronis Meyrick, 1932

Gracillariidae
Acrocercops heteroloba Meyrick, 1932
Acrocercops orianassa Meyrick, 1932
Caloptilia macropleura (Meyrick, 1932)
Corythoxestis aletreuta (Meyrick, 1936)
Dialectica carcharota (Meyrick, 1912)
Dialectica ehretiae (Vári, 1961)
Metacercops hexactis (Meyrick, 1932)
Metriochroa carissae Vári, 1963
Metriochroa scotinopa Vári, 1963
Phyllocnistis citrella Stainton, 1856
Porphyrosela homotropha Vári, 1963
Stomphastis heringi Vári, 1963
Stomphastis horrens (Meyrick, 1932)

Lasiocampidae
Anadiasa obsoleta (Klug, 1830)
Beriola anagnostarai (Berio, 1939)
Braura elgonensis (Kruck, 1940)
Mallocampa toulgoeti Rougeot, 1977
Odontocheilopteryx eothina Tams, 1931
Odontocheilopteryx lajonquieri Rougeot, 1977
Odontocheilopteryx maculata Aurivillius, 1905
Odontocheilopteryx myxa Wallengren, 1860
Pallastica hararia Zolotuhin & Gurkovich, 2009
Schausinna affinis Aurivillius, 1910
Sena donaldsoni (Holland, 1901)
Sena scotti (Tams, 1931)
Stoermeriana abyssinicum (Aurivillius, 1908)
Stoermeriana das (Hering, 1928)
Stoermeriana laportei Rougeot, 1977
Stoermeriana tamsi Rougeot, 1977
Stoermeriana viettei Rougeot, 1977
Streblote badaglioi (Berio, 1937)
Streblote panda Hübner, 1822
Theophasida cardinalli (Tams, 1926)

Limacodidae
Hamartia johanni Rougeot, 1977
Hamartia medora Hering, 1937

Lymantriidae
Aroa quadriplagata Pagenstecher, 1903
Bracharoa reducta Hering, 1926
Casama impura (Hering, 1926)
Casama vilis (Walker, 1865)
Croperoides negrottoi (Berio, 1940)
Crorema collenettei Hering, 1932
Dasychira grisea Pagenstecher, 1903
Euproctis chrysophaea (Walker, 1865)
Euproctis melalepia Hampson, 1909
Laelia diascia Hampson, 1905
Marblepsis flabellaria (Fabricius, 1787)
Pteredoa atripalpia Hampson, 1910
Stracilla translucida (Oberthür, 1880)

Metarbelidae
Aethiopina semicirculata Gaede, 1929
Salagena fetlaworkae Rougeot, 1977
Teragra lemairei Rougeot, 1977
Teragra villiersi Rougeot, 1977

Noctuidae
Achaea catella Guenée, 1852
Achaea finita (Guenée, 1852)
Achaea regularidia (Strand, 1912)
Acontia akbar Wiltshire, 1985
Acontia albatrigona Hacker, Legrain & Fibiger, 2008
Acontia amarei Hacker, Legrain & Fibiger, 2010
Acontia amhara Hacker, Legrain & Fibiger, 2008
Acontia antica Walker, 1862
Acontia apatelia (Swinhoe, 1907)
Acontia asbenensis (Rothschild, 1921)
Acontia aurelia Hacker, Legrain & Fibiger, 2008
Acontia basifera Walker, 1857
Acontia binominata (Butler, 1892)
Acontia buchanani (Rothschild, 1921)
Acontia caeruleopicta Hampson, 1916
Acontia carnescens (Hampson, 1910)
Acontia chiaromontei Berio, 1936
Acontia dichroa (Hampson, 1914)
Acontia discoidea Hopffer, 1857
Acontia discoidoides Hacker, Legrain & Fibiger, 2008
Acontia ectorrida (Hampson, 1916)
Acontia hampsoni Hacker, Legrain & Fibiger, 2008
Acontia hemixanthia (Hampson, 1910)
Acontia homonyma Hacker, Legrain & Fibiger, 2010
Acontia hoppei Hacker, Legrain & Fibiger, 2008
Acontia hortensis Swinhoe, 1884
Acontia imitatrix Wallengren, 1856
Acontia insocia (Walker, 1857)
Acontia karachiensis Swinhoe, 1889
Acontia lanzai (Berio, 1985)
Acontia melaphora (Hampson, 1910)
Acontia miogona (Hampson, 1916)
Acontia natalis (Guenée, 1852)
Acontia opalinoides Guenée, 1852
Acontia porphyrea (Butler, 1898)
Acontia praealba Hacker, Legrain & Fibiger, 2010
Acontia proesei Hacker, Legrain & Fibiger, 2008
Acontia purpurata Hacker, Legrain & Fibiger, 2010
Acontia purpureofacta Hacker, Legrain & Fibiger, 2010
Acontia robertbecki Hacker, Legrain & Fibiger, 2010
Acontia ruficincta Hampson, 1910
Acontia secta Guenée, 1852
Acontia semialba Hampson, 1910
Acontia sublactea Hacker, Legrain & Fibiger, 2008
Acontia szunyoghyi Hacker, Legrain & Fibiger, 2010
Acontia transfigurata Wallengren, 1856
Acontia trimaculata Aurivillius, 1879
Acontia uhlenhuthi Hacker, Legrain & Fibiger, 2008
Acontia versicolora Hacker, 2010
Acroriesis ignifusa Hampson, 1916
Aegleoides paolii Berio, 1937
Aegocera brevivitta Hampson, 1901
Aegocera ferrugo Jordan, 1926
Aegocera rectilinea Boisduval, 1836
Agrotis cinchonina Guenée, 1852
Agrotis segetum ([Denis & Schiffermüller], 1775)
Agrotis separata Guenée, 1852
Amazonides dubiomeodes Laporte, 1977
Amazonides koffoleense Laporte, 1977
Amazonides laheuderiae Laporte, 1984
Amazonides putrefacta (Guenée, 1852)
Amazonides zarajakobi Laporte, 1984
Amphia hepialoides Guenée, 1852
Amyna axis Guenée, 1852
Anoba trigonosema (Hampson, 1916)
Anomis flava (Fabricius, 1775)
Anomis sabulifera (Guenée, 1852)
Apospasta claudicans (Guenée, 1852)
Apospasta sabulosa D. S. Fletcher, 1959
Ariathisa abyssinia (Guenée, 1852)
Aspidifrontia ungemachi Laporte, 1978
Asplenia melanodonta (Hampson, 1896)
Athetis micra (Hampson, 1902)
Audea paulumnodosa Kühne, 2005
Autoba admota (Felder & Rogenhofer, 1874)
Axylia destefanii Berio, 1944
Brevipecten hypocornuta Hacker & Fibiger, 2007
Brevipecten niloticus Wiltshire, 1977
Brevipecten tessenei Berio, 1939
Calliodes appollina Guenée, 1852
Callopistria latreillei (Duponchel, 1827)
Caradrina atriluna Guenée, 1852
Caradrina torpens Guenée, 1852
Catephia albirena Hampson, 1926
Cerocala confusa Warren, 1913
Cerocala illustrata Holland, 1897
Cerocala masaica Hampson, 1913
Chitasida diplogramma (Hampson, 1905)
Chrysodeixis acuta (Walker, [1858])
Clytie sancta (Staudinger, 1900)
Crambiforma leucostrepta Hampson, 1926
Crameria amabilis (Drury, 1773)
Cretonia ethiopica Hampson, 1910
Crypsotidia woolastoni Rothschild, 1901
Ctenoplusia fracta (Walker, 1857)
Ctenoplusia camptogamma (Hampson, 1910)
Ctenusa curvilinea Hampson, 1913
Cucullia ennatae (Laporte, 1984)
Cucullia magdalenae (Laporte, 1976)
Cucullia simoneuai Laporte, 1976
Cucullia tedjicolora Laporte, 1977
Cyligramma latona (Cramer, 1775)
Cyligramma limacina (Guérin-Méneville, 1832)
Cyligramma magus (Guérin-Méneville, [1844])
Digama aganais (Felder, 1874)
Digama meridionalis Swinhoe, 1907
Diparopsis watersi (Rothschild, 1901)
Dysgonia torrida (Guenée, 1852)
Eublemma bifasciata (Moore, 1881)
Eublemma costivinata Berio, 1945
Eublemma debivar Berio, 1947
Eublemma nyctichroa Hampson, 1910
Eudocima materna (Linnaeus, 1767)
Eulocastra zavattarii Berio, 1944
Eutelia discitriga Walker, 1865
Eutelia favillatrix (Guenée, 1852)
Feliniopsis africana (Schaus & Clements, 1893)
Feliniopsis annosa (Viette, 1963)
Feliniopsis connivens (Felder & Rogenhofer, 1874)
Feliniopsis consummata (Walker, 1857)
Feliniopsis duponti (Laporte, 1974)
Feliniopsis hosplitoides (Laporte, 1979)
Feliniopsis insolita Hacker & Fibiger, 2007
Feliniopsis jinka Hacker, 2010
Feliniopsis nigribarbata (Hampson, 1908)
Feliniopsis satellitis (Berio, 1974)
Feliniopsis talhouki (Wiltshire, 1983)
Grammodes exclusiva Pagenstecher, 1907
Grammodes stolida (Fabricius, 1775)
Hadena bulgeri (Felder & Rogenhofer, 1874)
Helicoverpa armigera (Hübner, [1808])
Heliocheilus perdentata (Hampson, 1903)
Hemituerta mahdi (Pagenstecher, 1903)
Heraclia superba (Butler, 1875)
Heraclia viettei Kiriakoff, 1973
Heteropalpia exarata (Mabille, 1890)
Heteropalpia robusta Wiltshire, 1988
Heteropalpia vetusta (Walker, 1865)
Hiccoda clarae Berio, 1947
Hypena abyssinialis Guenée, 1854
Hyposada zavattarii Berio, 1944
Hypotacha fiorii Berio, 1943
Hypotacha ochribasalis (Hampson, 1896)
Iambiodes incerta (Rothschild, 1913)
Iambiodes postpallida Wiltshire, 1977
Janseodes melanospila (Guenée, 1852)
Leucania melianoides Möschler, 1883
Leumicamia oreias (D. S. Fletcher, 1959)
Lithacodia blandula (Guenée, 1862)
Lyncestoides unilinea (Swinhoe, 1885)
Masalia bimaculata (Moore, 1888)
Masalia fissifascia (Hampson, 1903)
Masalia flaviceps (Hampson, 1903)
Masalia flavistrigata (Hampson, 1903)
Masalia flavocarnea (Hampson, 1903)
Masalia galatheae (Wallengren, 1856)
Masalia hololeuca (Hampson, 1903)
Masalia latinigra (Hampson, 1907)
Masalia leucosticta (Hampson, 1902)
Masalia perstriata (Hampson, 1903)
Mentaxya ignicollis (Walker, 1857)
Micraxylia antemedialis Laporte, 1975
Micraxylia hypericoides Berio, 1963
Mitrophrys menete (Cramer, 1775)
Mocis repanda (Fabricius, 1794)
Neolaphygma leucoplagoides Berio, 1941
Oedicodia grisescens Berio, 1947
Oedicodia limbata Butler, 1898
Oedicodia rubrofusca Berio, 1947
Oligia adactricula (Guenée, 1852)
Ophiusa dianaris (Guenée, 1852)
Oraesia cerne (Fawcett, 1916)
Oraesia emarginata (Fabricius, 1794)
Oraesia intrusa (Krüger, 1939)
Oraesia provocans Walker, [1858]
Oraesia wintgensi (Strand, 1909)
Ozarba albimarginata (Hampson, 1896)
Ozarba boursini Berio, 1940
Ozarba cryptica Berio, 1940
Ozarba diaphora Berio, 1937
Ozarba isocampta Hampson, 1910
Ozarba lepida Saalmüller, 1891
Ozarba malaisei Berio, 1940
Ozarba parvula Berio, 1940
Ozarba phaea (Hampson, 1902)
Ozarba pluristriata (Berio, 1937)
Ozarba punctifascia Le Cerf, 1922
Ozarba rufula Hampson, 1910
Ozarba semitorrida Hampson, 1916
Ozarba terribilis Berio, 1940
Pandesma anysa Guenée, 1852
Pandesma muricolor Berio, 1966
Pericyma metaleuca Hampson, 1913
Plecoptera melanoscia Hampson, 1926
Plecopterodes melliflua (Holland, 1897)
Plecopterodes moderata (Wallengren, 1860)
Plecopterodes molybdena Berio, 1954
Pluxilloides hartigi Berio, 1944
Polydesma umbricola Boisduval, 1833
Polytela cliens (Felder & Rogenhofer, 1874)
Pseudomicrodes varia Berio, 1944
Rhabdophera clathrum (Guenée, 1852)
Rhesala moestalis (Walker, 1866)
Rhynchina endoleuca (Hampson, 1916)
Rhynchina revolutalis (Zeller, 1852)
Rougeotia abyssinica (Hampson, 1918)
Rougeotia aethiopica Laporte, 1974
Rougeotia ludovici Laporte, 1974
Rougeotia ludovicoides Laporte, 1977
Rougeotia obscura Laporte, 1974
Rougeotia roseogrisea Laporte, 1974
Simplicia extinctalis (Zeller, 1852)
Sphingomorpha chlorea (Cramer, 1777)
Spodoptera cilium Guenée, 1852
Spodoptera exigua (Hübner, 1808)
Stenosticta grisea Hampson, 1912
Stenosticta schreieri Hacker, 2010
Stilbotis berioi Laporte, 1984
Stilbotis ezanai Laporte, 1984
Stilbotis fumigera Laporte, 1977
Stilbotis ungemachi (Laporte, 1984)
Tathorhynchus leucobasis Bethune-Baker, 1911
Thiacidas acronictoides (Berio, 1950)
Thiacidas cerurodes (Hampson, 1916)
Thiacidas leonie Hacker & Zilli, 2007
Thiacidas permutata Hacker & Zilli, 2007
Thiacidas robertbecki Hacker & Zilli, 2007
Timora zavattarii Berio, 1944
Tracheplexia richinii Berio, 1973
Trichoplusia ni (Hübner, [1803])
Trichoplusia orichalcea (Fabricius, 1775)
Trigonodes exportata Guenée, 1852
Trigonodes hyppasia (Cramer, 1779)
Tycomarptes inferior (Guenée, 1852)
Tytroca alabuensis Wiltshire, 1970
Tytroca leucoptera (Hampson, 1896)
Uollega ungemachi Berio, 1945

Nolidae
Arcyophora longivalvis Guenée, 1852
Arcyophora patricula (Hampson, 1902)
Arcyophora zanderi Felder & Rogenhofer, 1874
Earias cupreoviridis (Walker, 1862)
Earias insulana (Boisduval, 1833)
Leocyma camilla (Druce, 1887)
Maurilia arcuata (Walker, [1858])
Meganola reubeni Agassiz, 2009
Neaxestis mesogonia (Hampson, 1905)
Negeta luminosa (Walker, 1858)
Nola pumila Snellen, 1875
Odontestis striata Hampson, 1912
Pardoxia graellsii (Feisthamel, 1837)

Notodontidae
Afroplitis dasychirina (Gaede, 1928)
Anaphe stellata Guérin-Méneville, 1844
Antheua birbirana Viette, 1954
Antheua gaedei Kiriakoff, 1962
Antheua ochriventris (Strand, 1912)
Antheua ornata (Walker, 1865)
Antheua tricolor Walker, 1855
Antheua trivitta (Hampson, 1910)
Antistaura decorata Kiriakoff, 1965
Desmeocraera kiriakoffi Thiaucourt, 1977
Polelassothys callista Tams, 1930
Psalisodes saalfeldi Kiriakoff, 1979
Scalmicauda azebeae Thiaucourt, 1977
Thaumetopoea apologetica Strand, 1909

Oecophoridae
Eucleodora chalybeella Walsingham, 1881

Plutellidae
Lepocnemis metapelista Meyrick, 1932
Plutella dryoxyla Meyrick, 1932
Plutella oxylopha Meyrick, 1932
Plutella stichocentra Meyrick, 1932

Pterophoridae
Agdistis obstinata Meyrick, 1920
Amblyptilia direptalis (Walker, 1864)
Arcoptilia gizan Arenberger, 1985
Exelastis atomosa (Walsingham, 1885)
Exelastis phlyctaenias (Meyrick, 1911)
Hellinsia aethiopicus (Amsel, 1963)
Hellinsia bigoti (Rougeot, 1983)
Megalorhipida leucodactylus (Fabricius, 1794)
Oidaematophorus negus Gibeaux, 1994
Paracapperia esuriens Meyrick, 1932
Platyptilia daemonica Meyrick, 1932
Platyptilia gondarensis Gibeaux, 1994
Platyptilia implacata Meyrick, 1932
Platyptilia morophaea Meyrick, 1920
Platyptilia sabius (Felder & Rogenhofer, 1875)
Pterophorus candidalis (Walker, 1864)
Pterophorus lindneri (Amsel, 1963)
Pterophorus rhyparias (Meyrick, 1908)
Stenoptilia aethiopica Gibeaux, 1994
Stenoptilia rougeoti Gibeaux, 1994
Stenoptilia tyropiesta Meyrick, 1932

Pyralidae
Endotricha ellisoni Whalley, 1963
Epicrocis pseudodiscomaculella (Amsel, 1935)
Harraria rufipicta Hampson, 1930

Saturniidae
Argema mimosae (Boisduval, 1847)
Bunaea alcinoe (Stoll, 1780)
Bunaeopsis birbiri Bouvier, 1930
Bunaeopsis oubie (Guérin-Méneville, 1849)
Eosia digennaroi Bouyer, 2008
Epiphora antinorii (Oberthür, 1880)
Epiphora bauhiniae (Guérin-Méneville, 1832)
Epiphora elianae Rougeot, 1973
Gonimbrasia belina (Westwood, 1849)
Gonimbrasia ellisoni Lemaire, 1962
Gonimbrasia fletcheri Rougeot, 1960
Gonimbrasia fucata Rougeot, 1978
Gynanisa arba Darge, 2008
Holocerina digennariana Darge, 2008
Lobobunaea phaedusa (Drury, 1782)
Ludia hansali Felder, 1874
Ludia orinoptena Karsch, 1892
Nudaurelia fasciata Gaede, 1927
Nudaurelia staudingeri Aurivillius, 1893
Nudaurelia ungemachti Bouvier, 1926
Parusta thelxione Fawcett, 1915
Pseudaphelia apollinaris (Boisduval, 1847)
Pseudobunaea heyeri (Weymer, 1896)
Urota melichari Bouyer, 2008
Urota sinope (Westwood, 1849)
Usta terpsichore (Maassen & Weymer, 1885)
Usta wallengrenii (C. Felder & R. Felder, 1859)
Yatanga smithi (Holland, 1892)

Sesiidae
Melittia abyssiniensis Hampson, 1919
Melittia aethiopica Le Cerf, 1917

Sphingidae
Agrius convolvuli (Linnaeus, 1758)
Cephonodes apus (Boisduval, 1833)
Ceridia heuglini (C. Felder & R. Felder, 1874)
Chaerocina ellisoni Hayes, 1963
Chaerocina jordani Berio, 1938
Dovania neumanni Jordan, 1926
Falcatula tamsi Carcasson, 1968
Hippotion celerio (Linnaeus, 1758)
Hippotion moorei Jordan, 1926
Hippotion pentagramma (Hampson, 1910)
Hippotion rebeli Rothschild & Jordan, 1903
Hippotion roseipennis (Butler, 1882)
Hippotion socotrensis (Rebel, 1899)
Hippotion stigma (Rothschild & Jordan, 1903)
Leucophlebia neumanni Rothschild, 1902
Leucostrophus alterhirundo d'Abrera, 1987
Lophostethus negus Jordan, 1926
Macropoliana natalensis (Butler, 1875)
Microclanis erlangeri (Rothschild & Jordan, 1903)
Nephele peneus (Cramer, 1776)
Nephele vau (Walker, 1856)
Nephele xylina Rothschild & Jordan, 1910
Polyptychoides grayii (Walker, 1856)
Polyptychoides niloticus (Jordan, 1921)
Pseudoclanis abyssinicus (Lucas, 1857)
Pseudoclanis bianchii (Oberthür, 1883)
Temnora pseudopylas (Rothschild, 1894)

Thyrididae
Arniocera cyanoxantha (Mabille, 1893)
Arniocera guttulosa Jordan, 1915
Lamprochrysa amata (Druce, 1910)
Marmax vicaria (Walker, 1854)
Netrocera setioides Felder, 1874

Tineidae
Afrocelestis minuta (Gozmány, 1965)
Ateliotum convicta (Meyrick, 1932)
Ceratophaga luridula (Meyrick, 1932)
Ceratophaga nephelotorna (Meyrick, 1932)
Ceratophaga tragoptila (Meyrick, 1917)
Ceratophaga vastellus (Zeller, 1852)
Cimitra efformata (Gozmány, 1965)
Cimitra estimata (Gozmány, 1965)
Criticonoma spinulosa Gozmány, 1965
Crypsithyris stenovalva (Gozmány, 1965)
Cylicobathra chionarga Meyrick, 1920
Dasyses rugosella (Stainton, 1859)
Dryadaula glycinoma (Meyrick, 1932)
Ectabola pygmina (Gozmány, 1965)
Edosa torrifacta (Gozmány, 1965)
Hapsifera gypsophaea Gozmány, 1965
Hapsifera ignobilis Meyrick, 1919
Hapsifera nidicola Meyrick, 1935
Hapsifera pachypsaltis Gozmány, 1965
Hapsifera revoluta Meyrick, 1914
Hapsifera rhodoptila Meyrick, 1920
Hapsifera richteri Gozmány, 1965
Hyperbola somphota (Meyrick, 1920)
Leptozancla zelotica (Meyrick, 1932)
Monopis addenda Gozmány, 1965
Monopis leopardina Gozmány, 1965
Monopis sciagrapha Bradley, 1965
Monopis speculella (Zeller, 1852)
Monopis triplacopa Meyrick, 1932
Myrmecozela isopsamma Meyrick, 1920
Opogona omoscopa (Meyrick, 1893)
Perissomastix lucifer Gozmány, 1965
Perissomastix othello (Meyrick, 1907)
Perissomastix perdita Gozmány, 1965
Perissomastix taeniaecornis (Walsingham, 1896)
Scalmatica separata Gozmány, 1965
Silosca mariae Gozmány, 1965
Tinissa spaniastra Meyrick, 1932

Tortricidae
Capua spilonoma Meyrick, 1932
Cydia calliglypta (Meyrick, 1932)
Eccopsis aegidia (Meyrick, 1932)
Eccopsis maschalista (Meyrick, 1932)
Eucosma vulpecularis Meyrick, 1932
Gypsonoma paradelta (Meyrick, 1925)
Metamesia physetopa (Meyrick, 1932)
Olethreutes polymorpha (Meyrick, 1932)
Phtheochroa lonnvei Aarvik, 2010
Procrica ophiograpta (Meyrick, 1932)
Tortrix diametrica Meyrick, 1932
Trachybyrsis chionochlaena Meyrick, 1932

Yponomeutidae
Yponomeuta ocypora (Meyrick, 1932)

Zygaenidae
Alteramenelikia jordani (Alberti, 1954)
Astyloneura bicoloria Röber, 1929
Epiorna abessynica (Koch, 1865)
Saliunca anhyalina Alberti, 1957
Saliunca meruana Aurivillius, 1910
Saliunca pallida Alberti, 1957

References

External links 

Ethiopia
Ethiopia
Moths